Stenopopanoceras is a genus of involute, discoidal ceratitid ammonites from the Middle Triassic that has been found on Spitsbergen and in arctic Russia and British Columbia.
  
The name, Stenopopanoceras, indicates that its shell as compressed, relatively thin; involute as for the family. The siphuncle is ventral throughout, unlike Parapopanoceras where in the siphuncle starts off more centrally located and migrates within the first few whorls to become ventral.  Septal necks start off retrochoanitic, pointing to the rear, but by the beginning of the third whorl are prochoanitic, forward pointing.

Related general include Amphipopanoceras and Parapopanoceras.

References 

 Vladimir V. Arkadiev  & Mikhail N. Vavilov 1984. Middle Triassic Parapopanoceratidae and Nathorstitidae (Ammonoidea) of Boreal Region: Internal Structure, Ontogeny and Phylogenetic Patterns. Geobios 
 E T Tozer 1981. Triassic Ammonoidea: Classification, evolution and relationship with Permian and Jurassic Forms. The Ammonoidea: The evolution classification, mode of life and geological usefulness of a major fossil group 66-100
 Stenopopanoceras. PbDb.

Ceratitida genera
Triassic ammonites
Fossils of British Columbia